Lawrence Clarke may refer to:

 Lawrence Clarke (politician) (1832–1890), Chief Factor of the District of Saskatchewan for the Hudson's Bay Company
 Lawrence Clarke (hurdler) (born 1990), sprint hurdler

See also
 Lawrence Gordon Clark, English television director and producer
 Laurence Clark (disambiguation)
 Larry Clarke (1925–2015), Canadian businessman